Čierna Voda is a village and municipality in Galanta District of the Trnava Region of southwest Slovakia.

Geography
The municipality lies at an elevation of 120 metres and covers an area of 12.142 km². It has a population of about 1410 people.

History
In the 9th century, the territory of Čierna Voda became part of the Kingdom of Hungary. In historical records the village was first mentioned in 1217.
After the Austro-Hungarian army disintegrated in November 1918, Czechoslovak troops occupied the area, later acknowledged internationally by the Treaty of Trianon. Between 1938 and 1945 Čierna Voda once more became part of Miklós Horthy's Hungary through the First Vienna Award. From 1945 until the Velvet Divorce, it was part of Czechoslovakia. Since then it has been part of Slovakia.

Genealogical resources

The records for genealogical research are available at the state archive "Statny Archiv in Bratislava, Slovakia"

 Roman Catholic church records (births/marriages/deaths): 1777-1892 (parish B)

See also
 List of municipalities and towns in Slovakia

References

External links
http://www.statistics.sk/mosmis/eng/run.html
Surnames of living people in Cierna Voda

Villages and municipalities in Galanta District